The following is the final results of the 1991 World Wrestling Championships. Men's competition were held in Varna, Bulgaria and Women's competition were held in Tokyo, Japan.

Medal table

Team ranking

Medal summary

Men's freestyle

Men's Greco-Roman

Women's freestyle

Participating nations

Men
494 competitors from 49 nations participated.

 (1)
 (3)
 (11)
 (2)
 (2)
 (20)
 (12)
 (16)
 (17)
 (1)
 (10)
 (2)
 (16)
 (4)
 (10)
 (12)
 (20)
 (5)
 (19)
 (1)
 (19)
 (7)
 (16)
 (8)
 (11)
 (20)
 (4)
 (4)
 (4)
 (10)
 (2)
 (7)
 (6)
 (8)
 (8)
 (5)
 (3)
 (20)
 (6)
 (1)
 (16)
 (20)
 (20)
 (9)
 (9)
 (10)
 (20)
 (20)
 (17)

Women
64 competitors from 13 nations participated.

 (2)
 (4)
 (9)
 (5)
 (1)
 (9)
 (1)
 (4)
 (4)
 (5)
 (5)
 (7)
 (8)

References

External links
UWW Database

World Wrestling Championships
W
W
W
W
International wrestling competitions hosted by Japan